The  is a Chinese mouth-blown polyphonic free reed instrument consisting of vertical pipes.

It is one of the oldest Chinese instruments, with images depicting its kind dating back to 1100 BCE, and there are original instruments from the Han dynasty that are preserved in museums today. Traditionally, the  has been used as an accompaniment instrument for solo  or  performances. In the modern large Chinese orchestra, it is used for both melody and accompaniment.

The  has been used in the works of a few non-Chinese composers, including Unsuk Chin, Jukka Tiensuu, Lou Harrison, Tim Risher, Daníel Bjarnason, Guus Janssen and Christopher Adler.

History

Ancient instruments with gourd wind chambers, varying numbers of pipes, with bamboo or metal reeds have been discovered in archaeological finds at the tomb of the Marquis Yi of Zeng in present-day Hubei province, and the Han tombs at Mawangdui in Hunan province.

In the 8th century, three  and three  were sent to the Japanese court and these have been preserved in the Shōsōin imperial repository in Nara. All the instruments had 17 pipes with a long curving mouthpiece and are very similar to the traditional  in use today. However, variants with different numbers of pipes, and chromatic instruments have been documented over the centuries.

Modern changes

The kinds of  currently used are the products of changes made since the early 20th century that enhanced its sound and volume as well as increasing its range. Early changes were made by Zheng Jinwen (1872–1935) who increased the number of pipes to 32, expanding its range and allowing it to play harmony and chords. The air chamber and size of the pipes were also enlarged, changing the tone color of the instrument. Later various changes were also introduced by players such as Weng Zhenfa and particularly Hu Tianquan, with different variants of the instrument produced.

Acoustics and performance
The 's reeds vibrate at a fixed frequency unlike single reeds, double reeds, and pointed free reeds which vibrate at the pitch according to the length of the attached air column. Covering the hole(s) on a traditional 's pipe(s) would cause the entire length of the pipe(s) to resonate with the reeds' frequency. If the hole is open, the resonant frequency would not match, and hence no sound is produced.

The  is sounded by either exhaling or inhaling into the mouthpiece, and players can produce a relatively continuous sound without pause by quickly switching between the two, similarly to playing a harmonica. The traditional performance style is to sound two or three notes at the same time by adding a fifth and/or octave above the main melody note. When a higher note is not available, a lower note a fourth below the main melody note can be played instead.

Types
 varieties can be classified into traditional  and keyed  (sometimes also known as "improved "). Keyed shengs were only developed in the 20th century, from roughly 1950 onwards.

However,  instruments are generally categorized into either type based on the kind of fingering system that they adopt. This includes (on traditional ) certain notes (namely the leading note, submediant, dominant, followed by tonic) present as a group on the left posterior side. Due to fourth and fifth harmonies being common in traditional  repertoire, the fingerings on traditional  are optimized for such. As a result, fingerings for traditional  tend to look jumbled up, and can vary regionally. Keyed , on the other hand, have sequenced fingerings that allow for easy key changes.

On a traditional , there are holes on the finger pipes which can be covered by the player's fingers to sound that particular note. On a keyed , the holes are opened and closed by means of keys or levers. The greater number of pipes combined with the size of the larger instruments makes it impractical to operate newer instruments without keys.

Traditional 

The traditional  used in, for example, northern Chinese ritual music,  and Jiangnan sizhu ensembles generally have 17 pipes but with only 13 or 14 sounding pipes. Its scale is mainly diatonic, for example the 17-pipe (4 of which are silent decorative pipes)  used in Jiangnan sizhu is tuned:

With the development of  music in mid-20th century China, the  underwent changes to increase its range and volume. The  had all its 17 pipes fitted with reeds, then the number of pipes increased to 21, and metal tubes were attached to the bamboo pipes to amplify its sound. The other change was the development of the keyed .

Nowadays, traditional  are usually only used for solo repertoire, due them not being fully chromatic (and also the fact that certain techniques – like glissandi – can only be achieved on a traditional ). For an orchestra setting, keyed  tend to be preferred for being fully chromatic. It is worth noting that many modern traditional  do come with some keys for ease of fingering; there are also fully chromatic traditional . These are still known by the blanket term "traditional " due to them retaining the typical traditional -like fingering. Also, traditional  are usually held in the player's hands when playing, and a 37-reed fully chromatic traditional  tends to be too heavy to be held for long performances.

Keyed 

Chromatic 24- and 26-reed keyed  were common during the 1950s, but current models usually have 32 to 38 reeds. There are four main ranges of keyed , forming a family of soprano, alto, tenor and bass. All are chromatic throughout their range, and equal tempered. They have markedly different fingering from their traditional counterparts, having been redesigned so that key changes can be achieved without cumbersome fingerings. These also differ from their traditional counterparts by the fact that they tend to be placed on the musician's lap or on a stand while playing.

Soprano 
The soprano  is a 36-reed  with a soprano range of G3 to F#6. It primarily uses the treble clef in sounding pitch.

However, to suit the needs of modern repertoire, 38- or even 42-reed  have become increasingly prevalent in the late 2010s (those go all the way up to C7). Some models even include levers that allow for sounding of chords (i.e. more than one note is sounded when one lever is depressed).

Alto 

The alto  is a 36-reed  with an alto range of C3 to B5. They sound a perfect 5th lower than soprano . They often sport an additional row of 12 black keys, that plays all 3 pipes corresponding to the same note in different octaves (e.g., pressing the black "C" causes the notes C3, C4 and C5 to be sounded simultaneously). It primarily uses the treble (octave down) and alto clefs (albeit less common as of the late 2010s – notably with Singapore Chinese Orchestra deciding to scribe alto  scores in treble clef). The alto variants tend to have a more mellow timbre than the slightly more metallic sounding soprano . It is worth noting the regional differences — while many countries have alto  with a range of C3 to B5, some regional variants tend to have a range of G2 to F#5 (i.e. the tenor 's range).

The alto  plays an important role in modern Chinese orchestras, serving to provide chordal accompaniment as well as supplementing lower-pitched instruments like the cello. The  is usually placed on the musician's lap; one would reach around to the buttons on its posterior (in effect hugging the instrument, and hence the name). This, however, presents the drawback of it being difficult to disassemble and reassemble for maintenance or repairs. The  on the other hand, is typically placed on a  stand. This form is so named as the pipes and resonators are arranged into 3 rows (in a linear manner) instead of a circular fashion. These are commonly seen in school orchestras, as there is a reduced likelihood of it being dropped (since it is placed on a stand), and is less difficult/expensive to repair (due to its simpler layout).

Tenor  
The tenor  is a 36-reed  with a tenor range of G2 to F5 that sound one octave lower than soprano , and primarily uses the tenor clef or treble clef (octave down), and at times the bass clef. This variant tends to have a warmer and richer timbre, despite being less common than its alto counterpart. They are sometimes made with more reeds to cover the alto 's range as well, and also come in 2 form factors ( and ).

Bass  
The bass  is usually a 32-reed  with a bass range of C2 to G4, and primarily uses the bass clef.

"held ", although it is placed on a stand due to its weight). With the bass , the differences between the 2 variants are more pronounced; bass paisheng tend to require a greater breath volume to play.

Keyboard  
In the 21st century, keyboard , or  that have a keyboard layout instead of the typical buttons, have emerged. These can vary from 37-reed  all the way to 53-reed ones (if not more like 61), covering a variety of ranges from alto to bass. The keyboard  has a range of up to 5 octaves from C2 to C7 just like many modern day pipe organs. Keyboard  are considered niche, as very few repertoires make use of the keyboard layout. However, repertoire written for piano is playable on them.

See also
Music of China
Traditional Chinese musical instruments
Khene
Lusheng
Mangtong
Plung
Saenghwang
Shō
Yu (wind instrument)

Notes

Further reading
 Alan R. Thrasher; Sheng article, Grove Music Online, Oxford Music Online.

External links

Sheng – Chinese mouth organ from the Silk Road Project
The Classical Free-Reed, Inc. History of the Free-Reed Instruments in Classical Music
 A visit to the home of master sheng player Hu Tianquan (胡天泉) – Part 1, Part 2,  Part 3, YouTube

Chinese musical instruments
Sets of free reeds
Vietnamese musical instruments
Mouth organs
Chinese words and phrases